The following are fauna species present at Toro Negro State Forest in Ponce, Puerto Rico.

 Agonostomus monticola
 Ameiva exsul
 Amphisbaena caeca
 Anolis cuvieri
 Antillean ghost-faced bat
 Atya lanipes
 Puerto Rican boa
 Borikenophis portoricensis
 Cane toad
 Common coquí
 Dwarf anole
 Eleutherodactylus portoricensis
 Greater bulldog bat
 Puerto Rican amazon
 Puerto Rican broad-winged hawk
 Puerto Rican sharp-shinned hawk
 Sicydium plumieri
 Small Asian mongoose
 Sooty mustached bat

See also

References

Toro Negro State Forest
Ponce, Puerto Rico